Pasig, officially the City of Pasig, is a 1st class highly urbanized city in the National Capital Region of the Philippines. According to the 2020 census, it has a population of 803,159 people.

It is located along the eastern border of Metro Manila with Rizal province, the city shares its name with the Pasig River. A formerly rural settlement, Pasig is primarily residential and industrial, but has been becoming increasingly commercial in recent years, particularly after the construction of the Ortigas Center business district in its west. The city is home to the Roman Catholic Diocese of Pasig, based in Pasig Cathedral, a landmark built around the same time as the town's foundation in 1573.

Pasig was formerly part of Rizal province before the formation of Metro Manila, the national capital region of the country. The seat of government of Rizal was hosted in Pasig at the old Rizal Provincial Capitol until a new capitol was opened in Antipolo, within Rizal's jurisdiction in 2009. However, it remained as the de jure, or official capital of the province until July 7, 2020. On June 19, 2020, President Rodrigo Duterte signed Republic Act No. 11475, which designated Antipolo as the official capital of Rizal.

Etymology

The city's name, Pasig, is a Tagalog word which means, "a river that flows into the sea" or "sandy bank of a river".

Etymologically, it is a word of Proto-Malayic (PM), *pasir, or Proto-Malayo-Polynesian (PMP) / Proto-Western-Malayo-Polynesian (PWMP) word, *pasiR. It is cognate with the 
meaning of "sand" in Malay (pasir) & "beach/sand" in Acehnese (pasi) and almost similar meanings and similar spellings in other Western Malayo-Polynesian (WMP) languages.

History

Early history
There are no surviving firsthand accounts of the history of Pasig before Spanish colonizers arrived in 1573 and established the settlement which they called the Ciudad-Municipal de Pasig.

However, surviving genealogical records and folk histories speak of a thriving indigenous Tagalog community (barangay) on the banks of the Bitukang Manok river (now nearly extinct, and known as Parian Creek), which eventually became modern-day Pasig. The greatest rulers of this pre-colonial polity are named Rajah Lontok and Dayang Kalangitan by the legends, which also say that they are closely related to the pre-colonial rulers of Tondo and Maynila.

The creek was given the name "Bitukang Manok" (Tagalog for "Chicken Gut"), due to the serpentine shape of its waterway. Among its early dwellers were ethnic Tagalogs & ethnic Han Chinese from Southern China (with their origins dating back from the Ming Dynasty), and the Indigenous Tinguian tribal nomads who migrated from the deep jungles of the Sierra Madre Mountain Range. The Bitukang Manok was once a principal tributary of the Marikina River. The Spanish colonizers called the creek "Rio de Pasig"; however, the natives still referred to it as the Bitukang Manok.

The first stretch of the Bitukang Manok became known as the "Pariancillo" (Estero de San Agustin), where its shoreline was once settled by ethnic Chinese and Malay merchants to trade their goods with the natives, until it developed up to the 1970s as the city's main public market. Likewise, the creek contributed enormously to the economic growth of Pasig during the Spanish Colonial Era, through irrigation of its wide paddy fields, and by being the progressive center of barter trade.

The Bitukang Manok, also known as the "Parian Creek", had once linked the Marikina River with the "Antipolo River". Before the Manggahan Floodway was built in 1986, The Parian Creek was actually connected to the Sapang Bato-Buli Creek (which serves as the boundary between Pasig's barangays Dela Paz-Manggahan-Rosario-Santa Lucia and the Municipality of Cainta), the Kasibulan Creek (situated at Vista Verde, Barangay San Isidro, Cainta), the Palanas Creek (leaving Antipolo through Barangay Muntindilao), the Bulaw Creek (on Barangay Mambungan, besides the Valley Golf and Country Club), and the Hinulugang Taktak Falls of Barangay Dela Paz (fed by the Taktak Creek passing close to the Antipolo Town Square), thus being the detached and long-abandoned Antipolo River.

Colonial period

Since the early 1600s up to the period of Japanese Imperialism, over a thousand Catholic devotees coming from "Maynilad" (Manila), "Hacienda Pineda" (Pasay), "San Juan del Monte", "Hacienda de Mandaloyon" (Mandaluyong), "Hacienda Mariquina" (Marikina), "Barrio Pateros", "Pueblo de Tagig" (Taguig), and "San Pedro de Macati" (Makati), followed the trail of the Parian Creek to the Pilgrimage Cathedral on the mountainous pueblo of Antipolo, Morong (the present-day Rizal province).

The Antipoleños and several locals from the far-reached barrios of "Poblacion de San Mateo", "Montalban" (Rodriguez), "Monte de Tanhai" (Tanay), "Santa Rosa-Oroquieta" (Teresa), and "Punta Ibayo" (Baras), had also navigated this freshwater creek once to go down to the vast "Kapatagan" (Rice plains) of lowland Pasig. Even the marian processions of the Our Lady of Peace and Good Voyage passed this route back and forth eleven times.

The creek has been also used during the British Occupation of Manila in 1762 to 1764 by the Royal British army, under the leadership of General William Draper and Vice Admiral Sir Samuel Cornish, 1st Baronet, to transport their red troops (and also the Sepoys they've brought from East India) upstream to take over the nearby forest-surrounded villages of Cainta and Taytay. They even did an ambush at the "Plaza Central" in front of the Pasig Cathedral, and turned the Roman Catholic Parish into their military headquarters, with the church's fortress-like "Campanilla" (belfry) serving as a watchtower against Spanish defenders sailing from the walled city of Intramuros via the Pasig River.

The Sepoys backstabbed their abusive British lieutenants and sided with the combined forces of the Spanish Conquistadors (assigned by the Governor-General Simon de Anda y Salazar), local rice farmers, fisherfolk, and even Chinese traders. After the British Invasion, the Sepoys remained and intermarried with Filipina women, and that explains the Hindu features of some of today's citizens of Pasig, especially Cainta and Taytay.

In 1742, an Augustinian friar named Fray Domingo Diaz, together with a group of wealthy "Mestizos de Sangley" (Chinese Mestizos) from Sagad, ordered a construction of a marble, roof-tiled cover bridge across the creek in the style of an oriental pagoda. It was named "Puente del Pariancillo", and a few years later, it changed to "Puente de Fray Felix Trillo", dedicated to the dynamic parochial curate of the Immaculate Conception Parish. Edmund Roberts visited Pasig in 1832.

On the night of May 2, 1896, more than 300 revolutionary Katipuneros, led by the Supremo Gat. Andres Bonifacio, Emilio Jacinto and Pio Valenzuela, secretly gained access in this very creek aboard a fleet of seventeen "Bangkas" (canoes) to the old residence of a notable Valentin Cruz at Barangay San Nicolas, and formed the "Asamblea Magna" (mass meeting).

Three months later on Saturday evening, August 29, about less than 2,000 working-class Pasigueños (along with a hundred Chinese "Trabajadores" (laborers) from the failed Sangley revolts of 1639 and throughout the 17th century), armed with coconuts, machetes and bayoneted muskets (some were donated by the rich Ilustrado families, while many of those guns were looted from Spanish authorities), joined the Katipunan and made a surprise attack at the "Municipio del Gobernadorcillo" (the current site of the Pasig City Hall) and its adjacent garrison of the "Guardias Civil" (Civil Guard), situated near the border of barangays Maybunga and Caniogan.

That was the first and victorious rebellion ever accomplished by the Katipunan, and that particular event was popularly known as the "Nagsabado sa Pasig" (the Saturday Uprising on Pasig). After they had managed to successfully out-thrown the seat of Spanish government on Pasig, the Katipuneros fled immediately and advanced towards a "Sitio" located at the neighboring "Ciudad de San Juan" called "Pinaglabanan", and there they launched their second attempt to end the numerous cases of corruption made by the greedy Castilian "Encomenderos" (town officials) and "Hacienderos" (landlords), which shall be commemorated as the Battle of San Juan del Monte.

On June 11, 1901, during the Philippine–American War, the province of Rizal was created through Act No. 137 of the Philippine Commission. Pasig was incorporated into the province of Rizal, and was designated as the capital of the new province.

In 1939, the barrio or sitio of Ogong (Ugong Norte), which includes the present-day Libis area, was separated from Pasig to form part of the newly established Quezon City.

After World War II

After World War II, the Bitukang Manok was slowly exposing its ecological downfall. It resulted in water pollution due to rational ignorance. The worst came to the Bitukang Manok in the late 1960s when the disappearing waterway, instead of being revived was totally separated from the Marikina River, and was converted into an open sewage ditch, with its original flow now moving in reverse towards the direction of the Napindan Channel (a portion of the Pasig River bordering between the barangays Kalawaan-Pinagbuhatan and Taguig), to give way to public commercial facilities.

The Martial Law era 

Pasig was home to a number of prominent human rights advocates who became prominent during the administration of Ferdinand Marcos. One of these advocates was lawyer and publisher Augusto "Bobbit" Sanchez, whose publication "The Weekly Post" was so hardhitting that Pasig politicians came to refer to it as the "Weekly Pest."  Another human rights advocate who was an early critic of Marcos' policies was opposition figure Jovito Salonga, a Pasig native who was elected representative of Rizal in 1961.

When Ferdinand Marcos' economic policy of using foreign loans to fund government projects during his second term resulted in economic crises at the beginning of the 1970s, numerous Pasigueños participated in the various protests of the time, which eventually came to be known as the First Quarter Storm. This included brothers Eman Lacaba and Pete Lacaba, who lived in nearby Pateros but studied at the Pasig Catholic College (PCC) where their mother was a teacher.

When Marcos suspended the writ of habeas corpus in 1971, eventually declared Martial Law in September 1972, students were unable to congregate. In Pasig, one of the prominent residences that sheltered them and allowed them to meet together was the Bahay na Tisa in Barangay San Jose. Because the house was also the venue of meetings of prominent Pasig leaders who were pro-Marcos, it came to be known as Pasig's "Freedom House."  The house has since been declared an Important Cultural Property by the Philippines' National Museum.

Another prominent site in Pasig which was affected by Martial Law was the Benpres Building, which was shuttered by the Philippine Constabulary when Marcos' declaration closed down all media outlets on September 23, 1972.

After the fall of the dictatorship, one of the first properties to be surrendered by a Marcos crony to the PCGG was the "Payanig sa Pasig" property, at the confluence of Ortigas, Meralco and Doña Julia Vargas Avenues, whose title businessman Jose Yao Campos said he was keeping under the name of the Mid-Pasig Land Development Corp (MPLDC) in lieu of Ferdinand Marcos.  This was eventually sequestered by the Presidential Commission on Good Government as part of the Unexplained wealth of the Marcos family.

Integration into Metro Manila

On November 7, 1975, Pasig was carved out of Rizal province and became part of Metro Manila when the Metro Manila Commission (precursor of Metro Manila Authority and later Metropolitan Manila Development Authority) was created through Presidential Decree 824.

Cityhood

In July 1994, Pasig was converted into a highly urbanized city through Republic Act 7829. And in December 1994, President Fidel V. Ramos signed it into law, which was ratified through a plebiscite on January 21, 1995.

Contemporary
On February 4, 2006, the ULTRA Stampede, in which 71 people died, happened during the first anniversary celebration of ABS-CBN's noontime show Wowowee, because of the prizes that were to be given away. The anniversary of the show would be held on PhilSports Arena but the event has been already cancelled due to the tragedy.

Pasig was one of the areas struck by the high flood created by Typhoon Ondoy (Ketsana) on September 26, 2009, which affected the Ortigas Avenue and the east city side of the Manggahan Floodway. It is the most destructive flood in Philippine history. Pasig is accessed by the Pasig River, wherein the waters of Marikina River channeled and the Manggahan Floodway routed to Laguna de Bay.

In the first week of August 2012, intense monsoon rain caused the 2012 Philippines flooding, which affected again Pasig and particularly the National Capital Region (NCR), Calabarzon and the southwest part of Luzon. The nonstop eight-day monsoon rain, strengthened by Typhoon Gener, caused the Marikina River to overflow and destroyed the same places that were ruined by Typhoon Ondoy in 2009.

On June 19, 2020, President Rodrigo Duterte signed into law Republic Act No. 11475, officially transferring the capital of the Rizal province from Pasig to Antipolo. The law took effect on July 7, 2020, almost 45 years since Pasig became part of Metro Manila and around 11 years since the Rizal provincial government moved to the latter city.

Geography
Pasig is bordered on the west by Quezon City and Mandaluyong; to the north by Marikina; to the south by Makati, the municipality of Pateros, and Taguig; and to the east by the municipalities of Cainta and Taytay in the province of Rizal.

The Pasig River runs through it and forms its southwestern and southeastern borders with Makati and Taguig respectively, while the Marikina River forms its western border with Quezon City. The artificial Manggahan Floodway, built in 1986, begins at its confluence with the Marikina River in its northeast.

Barangays

Pasig is politically subdivided into 30 barangays.
Its barangays are grouped into two districts for city council representation purposes. The first district encompasses the southern and western sections of the city, while the second district encompasses the northern and eastern sections. Among these barangays, 27 are located on the northern side or right bank of the Pasig River while 3 (Buting, San Joaquin and Kalawaan) are located on the river's southern side or left bank.

Climate
The dry season runs through the months of November to April, while the wet season starts in May and lasts to November. The wet season reaches its peak in the month of August. Maximum rainfall in usually occurs from the month of June to September. The highest temperature occurs during the month of April and May while the lowest occurs during the months of January & February.

The Philippines, due to its geographical location, is one of the Asian countries often affected by typhoons. It is located within the so-called "typhoon belt". Generally, typhoon season starts from June and ends in November. However, the rest of the months are not entirely free of the typhoons since they are unpredictable in nature and might enter the country anytime of the year.

Demographics

Population growth of Pasig has consistently been higher than the regional average. Thus, the percentage share of Pasig in the total population of Metro Manila has significantly increased. Its share has grown from less than 3% in 1960 to 4.5% in 1980 and then to almost 6% in 2015. Pasig's population is projected to reach one million between the 2025 and 2030 census years.

Religion

The Roman Catholic Diocese of Pasig was established in 2003 by Pope John Paul II as the diocese of the Catholic Church in the Philippines, with the Immaculate Conception Parish (Pasig Cathedral) as the seat.

Pasig is the headquarters of the Presbyterian Church of the Philippines.

Economy

19th century
Historically, Pasig produced rice, fruit and sugarcane.

Today

The western part of the city is where most of Pasig's financial resources are primarily concentrated. It includes numerous factories, warehouses, establishments and commercial facilities. They are primarily situated in Ortigas Center, Pasig proper and along E. Rodriguez Jr. Avenue (C-5) and Ortigas Avenue. Real estate and commercial developments along Mercedes Avenue and other areas near the city center are developing. The eastern part was mostly dominated with residential areas but numerous commercial establishments are now being developed along Marcos Highway. In the arguably more significant western part of Pasig, east of the city of Mandaluyong and part of the barangay of San Antonio, lies the Ortigas Center.

Ortigas Center is one of the top business districts in the country. Numerous high-rise office buildings, residential condominiums, commercial establishments, schools and malls are situated here. The University of Asia and the Pacific is also located here. The head office of the Integrated Bar of the Philippines was established in the district. The former headquarters of the Philippine Stock Exchange is located along ADB Avenue. San Miguel Corporation, owner of one of the largest producer of beer in Asia, also has its headquarters in the district along San Miguel Avenue. Situated along Ortigas Avenue is Crowne Plaza, a five-star hotel near Robinsons Galleria. Adjacent to Ortigas Center is Capitol Commons, a mixed-use development that was built on the old site of the second Rizal Provincial Capitol.

Notable developments along E. Rodriguez Jr. Avenue (C-5) include Arcovia City, The Grove by Rockwell, and Ortigas East (formerly Frontera Verde), home of the Tiendesitas market. El-Pueblo, a colonial-themed commercial complex in Ortigas Center, provides new concept of cafes, restaurants and bars. Metrowalk (formerly Payanig), a commercial hub along Ortigas Avenue and Meralco Avenue, was established in 2005 and comprises shops, depot warehouses, stalls, restaurants and bars. Bridgetowne Destination Estates, a  integrated township development of Robinsons Land, has its iconic Victor Monument and landmark bridge connecting Pasig and Quezon City. Parklinks, a  urban estate, will partly be built in Pasig near C-5.

Government

Local government
Pasig is governed primarily by the city mayor, the vice mayor and the city councilors. The mayor acts as the chief executive of the city while the city councilors act as its legislative body. The vice mayor, besides taking on mayoral responsibilities in case of a temporary vacancy, acts as the presiding officer of the city legislature. The two city districts have six elected councilors each.

City seal
The woman represents the Mutya ng Pasig. Pasig is derived from a Hindu word meaning a body of water connecting two bodies of water. On the lower left portion is the Pasig Cathedral, the seat of the Roman Catholic Diocese of Pasig. The factory in lower right portion represents the prosperity and progress of the city.

List of mayor and vice mayor

List of Members of Sangguniang Panlungsod ng Pasig

District 1: Reggie Balderrama, Volta Delos Santos, Eric Gonzales, Kiko Rustia, Pao Santiago, Simon Romulo Tantoco

District 2: Buboy Agustin, Syvel Asilo, Quin Cruz, Angelu De Leon, Maro Martires, Corie Raymundo

Sports

PhilSports Complex or the Philippine Institute of Sports Complex (formerly ULTRA) is a notable national sports complex of the Philippines. Located near Meralco Avenue, it is where the offices of the Philippine Sports Commission, Philippine Olympic Committee and some national sports associations are.

The city is currently represented by Pasig City MCW Sports in the Maharlika Pilipinas Basketball League. The team also used to play in the now defunct Metropolitan Basketball Association as the Pasig Pirates. The team play their home games at two venues within the city, the Pasig Sports Center and the Ynares Sports Arena.

Transportation

Road network

Pasig is accessed by the following major roads:
Ortigas Avenue
E. Rodriguez Avenue Jr. Avenue (C-5)
Pasig Boulevard
Julia Vargas Avenue
Shaw Boulevard
Meralco Avenue
Pioneer Street
Marcos Highway (Marikina-Infanta Highway)
Amang Rodriguez Avenue
ADB Avenue
San Miguel Avenue

Water transportation
Pasig is the location of the east end of the Pasig River. It is accessed by Pasig River Ferry Service with 7 stations named after the Barangays of the city beside the river, these are the following:
Pineda
San Joaquin
Bambang
Kalawaan
Pinagbuhatan
Maybunga
Nagpayong

Bridges
Pasig is accessed by the Pasig River and the Marikina River. The city has only eleven bridges:

C.P. Garcia Bridge – crosses the Pasig River
Kaginhawaan Bridge – crosses the Marikina River
Manalo Bridge – crosses the Marikina River
Rosario Bridge – crosses the Marikina River
Sandoval Bridge – crosses the Marikina River
Santa Rosa de Lima Bridge – crosses the Marikina River
Julia Vargas Bridge (parallel bridges) – crosses the Marikina River
Bambang Bridge – crosses the Napindan Channel
Napindan Bridge – crosses the Napindan Channel
Kalawaan Bridge – crosses the Pasig River
Ortigas Bridge – crosses the Manggahan Floodway
Manggahan Bridge (Daang Pasig Bridge) – crosses the Manggahan Floodway
F B Legaspi Bridge – crosses the Manggahan Floodway
Kaunlaran Bridge – crosses the Pasig River
Santa Monica–Lawton Bridge – crosses the Pasig River
Parklinks Bridge – crosses the Marikina River

Railway
This city is also served by Santolan and Marikina–Pasig Stations of LRT Line 2, albeit being located within the city of Marikina, located along Marcos Highway near the Pasig–Marikina boundary. The line's depot is located in Barangay Santolan, Pasig. The city will also be served by the Metro Manila Subway, which is currently under construction, and MRT Line 4, which has been approved. The Metro Manila Subway will have two stations in Ortigas Center, namely: Ortigas North and Ortigas South.

Long before the Manila Light Rail Transit System finally opened its services in the early 2000s, steam train services had once served Pasig in the past, even before World War II.

In Marikina, there is a street named "Daangbakal", also called by the names of "Shoe Avenue Extension", "Munding Avenue" and "Bagong Silang". There is also a similar "Daangbakal" in the San Mateo and Montalban (Rodriguez) areas, and on the maps one can notice that the two roads should have been connected with each other. In fact, as the name suggests in Tagalog, these streets were once a single railway line. The two sides of the "Daangbakal" roads were once connected by a bridge in the San Mateo-Marikina border. However, as the railroad tracks have been largely ignored after the Japanese occupation and was transformed into separate roads, the railway connection was abandoned.

The old railroad tracks, called the Montalban Branch, was connected from Tutuban station in Manila, passing through Tramo (Barangay Rosario, Pasig) coming all the way to the town of Marikina up to Montalban. On the northern end of the "Daangbakal" road in Montablan is a basketball court. That basketball court which stands today, surrounded by the Montalban Catholic Church and Cemetery, was once the railway station terminus of that particular line.

The present-day Santo Niño Elementary School in Marikina was said to be a train depot. And also it was said that a railroad station once stood in the Marikina City Sports Park.

The Montalban Line was completed in 1906, and continued its operation until 1936. It was said that the Imperial Japanese Army made use of this railway line during the Second World War. These railways were dismantled during the 1960s and were converted into ordinary roads.

Today, the citizens are dependent on tricycles, jeepneys, taxis, UV Express, buses, and AUV's which contribute to the everyday unusual and unbearable traffic of Metro Manila. Even now, there is uncertainty in the Northrail project, which links Manila to the northern provinces of Luzon, because of corruption within the project's construction.

Aside from the Montalban Line, another railway branch in the Antipolo Line had existed in the city before it was permanently removed. It traversed from Santa Mesa to Antipolo. There is also a street named "Daangbakal" in Antipolo, where like the "Daangbakal" roads on Marikina and San Mateo, a railway line once existed. Its operation ceased in 1917.

Education

Along C. Raymundo Avenue lies the national headquarters of Parents for Education Foundation, Inc. which runs schools such as PAREF Southridge School, PAREF Woodrose School, PAREF Northfield School, PAREF Rosehill School, and seven other schools.

At the heart of city proper, lies Colegio del Buen Consejo (CBC). It is one of the oldest school in Pasig and one of the educational institutions promulgated by the Roman Catholic Diocese of Pasig.

Secondary schools

Pasig Catholic College (PCC) is a private sectarian college located at the heart of Pasig. Established in 1913 as a small school managed by the CICM Fathers headed by Fr. Pierre Cornelis De Brouwer at the present Immaculate Conception Cathedral of Pasig, it is considered as the city's center of Catholic educational institution of the Roman Catholic Diocese of Pasig.

Pasig City Science High School (PCSHS) is the second science high school in Pasig recognized by the Department of Education for bright students of the city. It is located near Rainforest, a fully restored public resort and amusement park.

Rizal High School (RHS) is located in Pasig. Named after the Philippine national hero José Rizal, it is one of the world's largest secondary education by student population. Formerly hailed in the Guinness World Records as the largest school by overall enrolled students, it is now surpassed by the City Mississippi School (CMS) in Lucknow, India.

Tertiary Schools
Pamantasan ng Lungsod ng Pasig, a local university in Kapasigan, offers degree courses for poor, bright and deserving residents of Pasig. It is established under the mayoralty of Vicente C. Eusebio in 1999.

St. Paul College Pasig was near the Philippine Institute of Sports Complex (ULTRA). It was established in 1970 as one of the educational institutions administered by the Congregation of the Sisters of St. Paul of Chartres.

University of Asia and the Pacific (UA&P) in Ortigas Center traces back to the Center for Research and Communication (CRC) which started by two Harvard graduates in 1967 as an economic and social think-tank institution. Its spiritual and doctrinal formation is entrusted to Opus Dei.

Rizal Technological University (RTU), a state university based in Mandaluyong, has a branch campus located behind Rainforest Park in Pasig City. RTU Pasig campus is established 1994 that offered different courses in the field of Engineering, Education, Astronomy, Business and Entrepreneurship.

Arellano University, a private university based in Manila, also has its Andres Bonifacio Campus in Barangay Caniogan, Pasig. The  campus was established in 1946.

Technical and vocational training
MFI Foundation Inc. (formerly Meralco Foundation Institute) was located near the Ortigas Center along Ortigas Avenue. It is established in 1983 to serve and meet the industry's demand for middle-level technical manpower. As a partner of Philippine government's institution of the Technical Education and Skills Development Authority (Philippines) or TESDA, it provided two main programs in the Industrial Technician Program (ITP) which targets the youth and the Technical Training and MFI Training (formerly Testing Program) for skilled workers and professionals.

International Schools
Domuschola International School (DIS) is located in Barangay Ugong and offers the International Baccalaureate PYP program for elementary students. Established in 2000 as a pre-school under the name Second Mom, it has expanded to primary and secondary education. The school is in partnership with the TAO Corporation and as of 2015, became a candidate school of the IB Diploma Program.

Saint Gabriel International School along Sandoval Avenue is the sister school of the Chinese-based Manila Xiamen International School. It provides Mandarin Chinese classes and ESL education for local and foreign students.

Another international school that is located in Barangay Ugong is Reedley International School. Established in 1999, this school caters kindergarten to senior high school. The school adapts three curricula- Singaporean, Filipino and American.

Notable personalities

Sister cities
Local
Marikina, Metro Manila
Pamplona, Camarines Sur
International
 Marugame, Kagawa, Japan
 South San Francisco, California, United States

See also
Legislative district of Pasig
Roman Catholic Diocese of Pasig
Pasig City Museum
Candaba, Pampanga, a place where there is a barangay named Pasig.
Balabac, Palawan, a place where there is a barangay named Pasig.
Lambunao, Iloilo, a place where there is a barangay named Pasig.
Sara, Iloilo, a place where there is a barangay named Pasig.
 List of schools in Pasig

References

External links

 
 [ Philippine Standard Geographic Code]

Pasig
1573 establishments in the Philippines
Cities in Metro Manila
Populated places established in 1573
Populated places on the Marikina River
Populated places on the Pasig River
Former provincial capitals of the Philippines
Highly urbanized cities in the Philippines